Tapfuma Gutsa (born 1956) is a Zimbabwean sculptor.

A native of Harare, Gutsa studied sculpture with Cornelius Manguma at the Driefontein Mission School, later becoming the first Zimbabwean recipient of a British Council award.  The scholarship allowed him to study in London from 1982 until 1985, where he received a diploma in sculpture from the City and Guilds of London School of Art.

Gutsa is unusual among Zimbabwean stone sculptors for the breadth of materials he uses in his work; his sculptures incorporate metal, paper, wood, and other foreign materials. His winning sculpture at the Nedlaw exhibition, 1987, comprised smouldering grass engulfing a wooden bird.  He is the cousin of Dominic Benhura, who studied with him; he has also been a mentor to many young artists including Fabian Madamombe.

In 2007, Gutsa was one of eleven international artists commissioned by the Victoria and Albert Museum, London, to produce work for an exhibition titled 'Uncomfortable Truths: The Shadow of Slave Trading on Contemporary Art'.

Awards 
 1987 Nedlaw award for sculpture, National Gallery of Zimbabwe

References

External links 
Bio
 Tapfuma Gutsa biography on Artnet 

1956 births
Living people
People from Harare
20th-century Zimbabwean sculptors
21st-century Zimbabwean sculptors